Nowosielce may refer to the following places in Poland:
 Nowosielce, Trzebnica County in Lower Silesian Voivodeship (south-west Poland)
 Nowosielce, Przeworsk County in Subcarpathian Voivodeship (south-east Poland)
 Nowosielce, Sanok County in Subcarpathian Voivodeship (south-east Poland)